B-Unique Records is a London-based record label, and publishing company founded in 2001 by Mark Lewis and Martin Toher.

B-Unique's current roster includes John Newman, Kodaline,  James Bay, The Mispers, Darlia, Benjamin Francis Leftwich, Luke Sital Singh, Port Isla and artists and writers Ian Broudie, Samuel Preston, John Power, Liam O'Donnell, Jonny Coffer, Anders Grahn, Grace Tither, James Flannigan and Ralph Pelleymounter.

Other bands include Kaiser Chiefs, The Twang, The Automatic, The Ordinary Boys and Aqualung. Also released on the label to critical acclaim: Primal Scream, Fenech Soler, Mull Historical Society, Leaves, [spunge] Alkaline Trio, Hot Hot Heat, Saves The Day, Rocket from the Crypt, Bedouin Soundclash, Har Mar Superstar and Coheed and Cambria.

Before launching B-Unique Toher signed artists including Therapy?, The Bluetones, Dodgy and Cud to A&M. Mark Lewis as Head of A&R at Polygram Music and London Records signed Echo and The Bunnymen, Cast, Alisha's Attic and many others.

Roster
Kodaline
James Bay
John Newman
Darlia
The Mispers
Port Isla
Ian Broudie
John Power
Samuel Preston
Liam O'Donnell
Benjamin Francis Leftwich
Luke Sital Singh
Anders Grahn
Grace Tither
Ralph Pellymounter
James Flannigan

Former artists
Alkaline Trio
Alterkicks
Aqualung
The Automatic
Bedouin Soundclash
Coheed and Cambria
Fenech Soler
Gay Dad
Har Mar Superstar
Hot Hot Heat
Kaiser Chiefs
Leaves
Millionaires
Mull Historical Society
The Ordinary Boys
Saves the Day
Spunge
Rocket From The Crypt
The Twang
Pull Tiger Tail

Publication
Girls' Generation - "Karma Butterfly" (Japanese Language non-title track)

See also
 List of record labels
 List of independent UK record labels

References

External links
 Official site
 Interview with Mark Lewis, HitQuarters August 2005
 KOMCA Publishing Listing For "Karma Butterfly"

British record labels
Indie rock record labels
Alternative rock record labels